USS Congress (FFG-63) will be the second ship of the  of guided-missile frigates and the seventh ship in the United States Navy bearing this name. She is named in honor of the first USS Congress, one of the original six frigates of the United States Navy, and her name was among ten names submitted to President George Washington by Secretary of War Timothy Pickering in March 1795 for the frigates that were to be constructed.

References 

Proposed ships of the United States Navy